

Events

Births

Deaths
 Philippe de Rémi (born 1247), French jurist, royal official and poet
 Dnyaneshwar (born 1275), Maharashtran saint, poet, philosopher and yogi

References

Bibliography
 

13th-century poetry
Poetry